The escudo was the currency of Chile between 1960 and 1975, divided into 100 centésimos. It replaced the (old) peso at a rate of 1 escudo = 1000 pesos and was itself replaced by a new peso, at a rate of 1 peso = 1000 escudos. The symbol Eº was used for the escudo.

History
Through Law 13,305, published on April 6, 1959, the escudo entered into circulation on January 1, 1960, replacing the old peso. Its equivalence was Eº 1 = $1000 (pesos). The escudo was subdivided into centésimos. As the old banknotes had to be replaced, the Central Bank took the provisional measure of authorizing the overstamping of the existing banknotes of 10, 50, 100, 500, 1,000, 5,000, 10,000 and 50,000 pesos. They had printed in red ink, in the white oval of the watermark on the right side of the back, the equivalent of their value in escudos, according to the exchange rate $1000 = Eº 1. The overstamping of the banknotes began in November 1959.

On December 31, 1973, by decree law 231, it was established that all payments should be made in whole escudos, eliminating the centésimos. Through decree law 1123, published on August 4, 1975, Chile returned to the peso. The equivalence was $1 = Eº 1000.

Coins
In 1960, aluminium 1 centésimo and aluminium-bronze 2, 5 and 10 centésimo coins were introduced, followed by aluminium  centésimo in 1962. In 1971, a new coinage was introduced, consisting of aluminium-bronze 10, 20 and 50 centésimos and cupro-nickel 1, 2 and 5 escudos. This coinage was issued for two years, with aluminium 5 escudos produced in 1972. In 1974 and 1975, aluminium 10 escudos and nickel-brass 50 and 100 escudos were issued.

Banknotes
In 1959, provisional banknotes were produced by the Banco Central de Chile. These were modified versions of the old peso notes, with the centésimo or escudo denomination added to the design. In 1971, 500 escudo notes were introduced, followed by 1000 escudos and 5000 escudos in 1973 (depicting José Miguel Carrera) and 10,000 escudos in 1974 (depicting a portrait of Bernardo O'Higgins).

References

External links
Information on Exchange Rates of The Americas

Modern obsolete currencies
1960 establishments in Chile
1975 disestablishments in Chile
Escudo, Chilean
Escudo
Currencies of Chile